The National Basketball League of Canada Most Valuable Player (MVP) is an annual National Basketball League of Canada award given since the league's inaugural 2011–12 season for the best performing player in the regular season. The winner, along with those of the other major awards, are nominated by the NBL Canada coaches. Every player that has been named MVP has come from the United States, with the exception of English, and none have won it multiple times.

Winners

References 

NBL Canada
National Basketball League of Canada awards